The Loisach is a river that flows through Tyrol, Austria and Bavaria, Germany. Its name might be Celtic in origin, from Proto-Celtic *lawo and *iskā, both of which mean "water". The Loisach goes through the great swamp .

The Loisach is a  left tributary to the Isar. The source of the Loisach is near Ehrwald in Austria. The Loisach flows past Garmisch-Partenkirchen and into the Kochelsee. At the Kochelsee the water that was diverted from the upper river Isar for the Walchensee Hydroelectric Power Station joins the Loisach.  The Loisach then flows out of Kochelsee and joins the Isar at Wolfratshausen. A canal joins the Isar and the Loisach returning the water diverted for power generation to the Isar before Wolfratshausen to reduce the risk of flooding in the town.

The most important tributaries of the Loisach entering from the right-hand side are the Hammersbach, the Partnach near Garmisch-Partenkirchen, the streams Kuhflucht near Farchant, Röhrlbach and Lauterbach near Oberau, the Mühlbach near Eschenlohe, as well as the Eschenlaine near Eschenlohe, and the Kaltwasserleine near Ohlstadt and the Lainbach coming from the Benediktenwand.

References

 
Rivers of Bavaria
Rivers of Tyrol (state)
International rivers of Europe
Rivers of Austria
Rivers of Germany